Synima is a genus of tropical rainforest trees, constituting part of the plant family Sapindaceae.

Three species are known to science , found growing naturally in north eastern Queensland, Australia, and in New Guinea.

Species
This listing was sourced from the Australian Plant Name Index and Australian Plant Census, the Australian Tropical Rainforest Plants (2010) information system, original taxonomic research publications, Flora Malesiana and the Flora of Australia.
 Synima cordierorum  – NE. Qld and New Guinea
 Synima macrophylla  – NE. Qld and New Guinea
 Synima reynoldsiae  – NE. Qld endemic

References

Cited works 
 
 

 

Flora of New Guinea
Flora of Papua New Guinea
Flora of Queensland
Sapindales of Australia
Sapindaceae
Sapindaceae genera